John Kirby may refer to:

Arts and entertainment
 Joshua Kirby (1716–1774), often mistakenly called John Joshua Kirby, British landscape painter, engraver, and writer
 John Kirby (artist) (born 1949), British painter
 John Kirby (musician) (1908–1952), American jazz musician
 John Carroll Kirby, American pianist, record producer and composer

Politics
 John Kirby (Canadian politician) (1772–1846), Canadian businessman & politician
 John Kirby (admiral), United States Navy admiral
 John Kirby (MP), member of parliament for Hertfordshire

Sports
 John Kirby (baseball) (1865–1931), baseball player
 John Kirby (American football) (born 1942), American football player
 John Kirby (cricketer) (born 1936), English cricketer
 Jon Luke Kirby (born 1998), rugby league footballer

Other people
 John Kirby (topographer) (1690–1753), English mapmaker and illustrator
 John Kirby (surgeon) (1781–1853), president of the Royal College of Surgeons in Ireland
 John Henry Kirby (1860–1940), American businessman
 John Kirby (bishop) (born 1938), Irish bishop
 John Kirby (attorney) (1939–2019), American lawyer and namesake of Nintendo character Kirby

See also 
 John Kirby Allen (1810–1838), American pioneer
 Jack Kirby (disambiguation)
 John Kirkby (disambiguation)